Chambers is a common surname of English origin. It usually denoted either a servant who worked in his master's private chambers, or a camararius, a person in charge of an exchequer room. At the time of the British census of 1881, the relative frequency of the surname Chambers was highest in Nottinghamshire (4.4 times the British average), followed by Northamptonshire, Huntingdonshire, Lincolnshire, Bedfordshire, Rutland, Suffolk, Derbyshire, Haddingtonshire and Kent. Related surnames include Chalmers and Chamberlain.

Notable people surnamed Chambers

Notable people with the surname include:

Disambiguation
 David Chambers (disambiguation) 
 Jack Chambers (disambiguation) 
 James Chambers (disambiguation) 
 John Chambers (disambiguation) 
 Paul Chambers (disambiguation) 
 Robert Chambers (disambiguation)
 William Chambers (disambiguation)
 Chambers brothers (disambiguation)

American
 Aden Chambers (born c. 1986), American pro wrestler also known as Dalton Castle and Ashley Remington
 Annika Chambers, American soul blues singer and songwriter 
 B.J., Larry, Willie and Otis Chambers, the Chambers Brothers, a criminal organization in Detroit during the 1980s
 Becky Chambers (author) (born 1985), American science-fiction writer
 Bill Chambers (baseball) (1888–1962), American baseball player
 Bill Chambers (basketball) (born 1930), American basketball player
 Boyd Chambers (1884–1964), American college sports coach
 C. Fred Chambers (1918–1989), American oilman and political activist
 Charles Edward Chambers (1883–1941), American illustrator and classical painter
 Chris Chambers (born 1978), American football player
 Craig Chambers, American computer scientist
 Dennis Chambers (born 1959), American drummer
 Ernie Chambers (born 1937), Nebraska state senator
 Evan Chambers (born 1963), American composer
 Ezekiel F. Chambers (1788–1867), American jurist and politician
 Faune A. Chambers (born 1976), American actress
 Henry E. Chambers (1860–1929), Louisiana historian and educator
 Jason Chambers (born 1980), American actor and mixed martial arts fighter
 Juanita Chambers, American bridge player
 Julius L. Chambers (1936–2013), American lawyer, civil rights leader and educator
 Justin Chambers (born 1970), American model and actor
 Kim Chambers (born 1974), American pornographic actor
 Marilyn Chambers (1952–2009), American pornographic actress
 Michael Chambers (born 1967),  American dancer and actor
 Pat Chambers (born 1971), American basketball coach
 Paul Chambers (1935–1969), American jazz bassist active in the 1950s and 1960s
 Priscilla Chambers, American drag queen
 Sean Chambers, (born 1965), American basketball player
 Sean Chambers (musician), American blues-rock singer, guitarist, and songwriter
 Shirley Chambers (1913-2011), American film actress of the 1930s
 Thomas Chambers (painter), (1808-1869), American landscape painter
 Tim Chambers (baseball), American college baseball coach
 Tom Chambers (basketball) (born 1959), American former basketball player
 Tom Chambers (judge), associate justice of the Washington State Supreme Court
 Vactor Tousey Chambers (1830–1883), American entomologist 
 W. Paris Chambers (1854–1913), American cornetist and bandmaster
 Wally Chambers (born 1951), American professional football player
 Walter B. Chambers (1866–1945), New York City architect
 Wheaton Chambers (1887-1958), American actor
 Whittaker Chambers (1901–1961), American writer, editor, ex-Soviet spy

Australian
 Kasey Chambers (born 1976), Australian country singer
 James and John Chambers, the Chambers brothers, early settlers in South Australia
 Steven Chambers (born 1990), Australian baseball player

Canadian
 Carlton Chambers (born 1975), Canadian sprint athlete
 Michael A. Chambers, former president of the Canadian Olympic Committee
 Munro Chambers, Canadian actor
 Nanci Chambers (born 1963), Canadian-born American actress
 Ruth Chambers (born 1960), Canadian artist

English
 Aidan Chambers (born 1934), English children's author
 Ashley Chambers (born 1990), English footballer
 Calum Chambers (born 1995), English footballer
 Dominic Chambers (born 1984), English cricketer
 Dorothea Chambers (1878–1960), British-American female tennis player
 Dwain Chambers (born 1978), British sprinter
 Edmund Kerchever Chambers (1866–1954), English literary critic and Shakespearean scholar
 Emma Chambers (1964–2018), English actress
 Emma Chambers (soubrette) (1848–1933), English mezzo-soprano
 Ephraim Chambers (c.1680–1740), English writer and encyclopedist
 Guy Chambers (born 1963), English songwriter
 Luke Chambers (born 1985), English footballer
 Marianne Chambers (fl. 1799-1811 or 1812), English playwright
 Raymond Wilson Chambers (1874–1942) literary scholar, author, librarian and academic
 Thomas Chambers (Agent of Madras), English administrator and factor of the British East India Company
 Tom Chambers (actor) (born 1977), English actor
 Lee Chambers (psychologist) (born 1985),  British psychologist, entrepreneur and radio host

Irish
 Lisa Chambers (born 1983), Irish politician

Gordon Chambers (born 1974), Irish Scientist

Italian
 Sandra Chambers (born 1967), Italian singer

Scottish
 Oswald Chambers (1874–1917), Scottish Protestant minister and teacher

Trinidadian
 George Chambers (1928–1997), former prime minister of Trinidad and Tobago

New Zealander
 Colin Chambers (1926–2005), New Zealand swimmer
 Kim Chambers (swimmer), open water swimmer from New Zealand
 Noel Chambers (1923–1990), New Zealand swimmer

Fictional characters 
 Chris Chambers, fictional character from the Stephen King novella The Body and the film version Stand By Me
 Diane Chambers, fictional character on the U.S. television series Cheers
 Glenn Chambers, fictional character from the web serial, Worm
 Kelly Chambers, fictional character from the Mass Effect video game franchise
 Lou Chambers, fictional character from the novel and film "A Simple Plan"
 Peter Chambers, fictional character from American old time radio detective show Crime and Peter Chambers
 Rebecca Chambers, fictional character from the Resident Evil video game franchise

References

External links
 Chambers Surname DNA Project

English-language surnames
Occupational surnames
English-language occupational surnames